Dynamic nuclear polarization (DNP) results from transferring spin polarization from electrons to nuclei, thereby aligning the nuclear spins to the extent that electron spins are aligned. Note that the alignment of electron spins at a given magnetic field and temperature is described by the Boltzmann distribution under the thermal equilibrium. It is also possible that those electrons are aligned to a higher degree of order by other preparations of electron spin order such as: chemical reactions (leading to Chemical-Induced DNP, CIDNP), optical pumping and spin injection. DNP is considered one of several techniques for hyperpolarization. DNP can also be induced using unpaired electrons produced by radiation damage in solids.

When electron spin polarization deviates from its thermal equilibrium value, polarization transfers between electrons and nuclei can occur spontaneously through electron-nuclear cross relaxation and/or spin-state mixing among electrons and nuclei. For example, the polarization transfer is spontaneous after a homolysis chemical reaction. On the other hand, when the electron spin system is in a thermal equilibrium, the polarization transfer requires continuous microwave irradiation at a frequency close to the corresponding electron paramagnetic resonance (EPR) frequency. In particular, mechanisms for the microwave-driven DNP processes are categorized into the Overhauser effect (OE), the solid-effect (SE), the cross-effect (CE) and thermal-mixing (TM).

The first DNP experiments were performed in the early 1950s at low magnetic fields but until recently the technique was of limited applicability for high-frequency, high-field NMR spectroscopy, because of the lack of microwave (or terahertz) sources operating at the appropriate frequency. Today such sources are available as turn-key instruments, making DNP a valuable and indispensable method especially in the field of structure determination by high-resolution solid-state NMR spectroscopy.

Mechanisms

The Overhauser effect
DNP was first realized using the concept of the Overhauser effect, which is the perturbation of nuclear spin level populations observed in metals and free radicals when electron spin transitions are saturated by microwave irradiation. This effect relies on stochastic interactions between an electron and a nucleus. The 'dynamic' initially meant to highlight the time-dependent and random interactions in this polarization transfer process.

The DNP phenomenon was theoretically predicted by Albert Overhauser in 1953
 
and initially drew some criticism from Norman Ramsey, Felix Bloch and other renowned physicists of the time on the grounds of being "thermodynamically improbable". The experimental confirmation by Carver and Slichter
 as well as an apologetic letter from Ramsey both reached Overhauser in the same year.

The so-called electron-nucleus cross-relaxation, which is responsible for the DNP phenomenon is caused by rotational and translational modulation of the electron-nucleus hyperfine coupling. The theory of this process is based essentially on the second-order time-dependent perturbation theory solution of the von Neumann equation for the spin density matrix.

While the Overhauser effect relies on time-dependent electron-nuclear interactions, the remaining polarizing mechanisms rely on time-independent electron-nuclear and electron-electron interactions.

The solid effect
The simplest spin system exhibiting the SE DNP mechanism is an electron-nucleus spin pair. The Hamiltonian of the system can be written as:

These terms are referring respectively to the electron and nucleus Zeeman interaction with the external magnetic field, and the hyperfine interaction. S and I are the electron and nuclear spin operators in the Zeeman basis (spin  considered for simplicity), ωe and ωn are the electron and nuclear Larmor frequencies, and A and B are the secular and pseudo-secular parts of the hyperfine interaction. For simplicity we will only consider the case of |A|,|B|<<|ωn|. In such a case A has little effect on the evolution of the spin system. During DNP a MW irradiation is applied at a frequency ωMW and intensity ω1, resulting in a rotating frame Hamiltonian given by
where 

The MW irradiation can excite the electron single quantum transitions ("allowed transitions") when ωMW is close to ωe, resulting in a loss of the electron polarization. In addition, due to the small state mixing caused by the B term of the hyperfine interaction, it is possible to irradiate on the electron-nucleus zero quantum or double quantum ("forbidden") transitions around ωMW = ωe ± ωn, resulting in polarization transfer between the electrons and the nuclei. The effective MW irradiation on these transitions is approximately given by Bω1/2ωn.

Static sample case
In a simple picture of an electron-nucleus two-spin system, the solid effect occurs when a transition involving an electron-nucleus mutual flip (called Zero Quantum or Double Quantum) is excited by a microwave irradiation, in the presence of relaxation. This kind of transition is in general weakly allowed, meaning that the transition moment for the above microwave excitation results from a second-order effect of the electron-nuclear interactions and thus requires stronger microwave power to be significant, and its intensity is decreased by an increase of the external magnetic field B0. As a result, the DNP enhancement from the solid effect scales as B0−2 when all the relaxation parameters are kept constant. Once this transition is excited and the relaxation is acting, the magnetization is spread over the "bulk" nuclei (the major part of the detected nuclei in an NMR experiment) via the nuclear dipole network.
This polarizing mechanism is optimal when the exciting microwave frequency shifts up or down by the nuclear Larmor frequency from the electron Larmor frequency in the discussed two-spin system. The direction of frequency shifts corresponds to the sign of DNP enhancements. 
Solid effect exist in most cases but is more easily observed if the linewidth of the EPR spectrum of involved unpaired electrons is smaller than the nuclear Larmor frequency of the corresponding nuclei.

Magic Angle Spinning Case
In the case of Magic Angle Spinning DNP (MAS-DNP), the mechanism is different but to understand it, a two spins system can still be used. The polarization process of the nucleus still occurs when the microwave irradiation excites the Double Quantum or Zero Quantum transition, but due to the fact that the sample is spinning, this condition is only met for a short time at each rotor cycle (which makes it periodical). The DNP process in that case happens step by step and not continuously as in the static case.

The cross effect

Static case
The cross effect requires two unpaired electrons as the source of high polarization. Without special condition, such a three spins system can only generate a solid effect type of polarization. However, when the resonance frequency of each electron is separated by the nuclear Larmor frequency, and when the two electrons are dipolar coupled, another mechanism occurs: the cross-effect. In that case, the DNP process is the result of irradiation of an allowed transition (called single quantum) as a result the strength of microwave irradiation is less demanded than that in the solid effect. In practice, the correct EPR frequency separation is accomplished through random orientation of paramagnetic species with g-anisotropy. Since the "frequency" distance between the two electrons should be equal to the Larmor frequency of the targeted nucleus, Cross-Effect can only occur if the inhomogeneously broadened EPR lineshape has a linewidth broader than the nuclear Larmor frequency. Therefore, as this linewidth is proportional to external magnetic field B0, the overall DNP efficiency (or the enhancement of nuclear polarization) scales as B0−1. This remains true as long as the relaxation times remain constant.  Usually going to higher field leads to longer nuclear relaxation times and this may partially compensate for the line broadening reduction.
In practice, in a glassy sample, the probability of having two dipolarly coupled electrons separated by the Larmor frequency is very scarce.  Nonetheless, this mechanism is so efficient that it can be experimentally observed alone or in addition to the Solid-Effect.

Magic Angle Spinning case
As in the static case, the MAS-DNP mechanism of Cross effect is deeply modified due to the time dependent energy level. By taking a simple three spin system, it has been demonstrated that the Cross-Effect mechanism is different in the Static and MAS case. The Cross Effect is the result of very fast multi-step process involving EPR single quantum transition, electron dipolar anti-crossing and Cross Effect degeneracy conditions.
In the most simple case the MAS-DNP mechanism can be explained by the combination of a single quantum transition followed by the Cross-Effect degeneracy condition, or by the electron-dipolar anti-crossing followed by the Cross-Effect degeneracy condition.

This in turn change dramatically the CE dependence over the static magnetic field which doesn't scale like B0−1 and makes it much more efficient than the solid effect.

Thermal mixing
Thermal mixing is an energy exchange phenomenon between the electron spin ensemble and the nuclear spin, which can be thought of as using multiple electron spins to provide hyper-nuclear polarization. Note that the electron spin ensemble acts as a whole because of stronger inter-electron interactions. The strong interactions lead to a homogeneously broadened EPR lineshape of the involved paramagnetic species. The linewidth is optimized for polarization transfer from electrons to nuclei, when it is close to the nuclear Larmor frequency. The optimization is related to an embedded three-spin (electron-electron-nucleus) process that mutually flips the coupled three spins under the energy conservation (mainly) of the Zeeman interactions. Due to the inhomogeneous component of the associated EPR lineshape, the DNP enhancement by this mechanism also scales as B0−1.

DNP-NMR Enhancement Curves

Many types of solid materials can exhibit more than one mechanism for DNP.  Some examples are carbonaceous materials such bituminous coal and charcoal (wood or cellulose heated at high temperatures above their decomposition point which leaves a residual solid char). To separate out the mechanisms of DNP and to characterize the electron-nuclear interactions occurring in such solids a DNP enhancement curve can be made.  A typical enhancement curve is obtained by measuring the maximum intensity of the NMR FID of the 1H nuclei, for example, in the presence of continuous microwave irradiation as a function of the microwave frequency offset.

Carbonaceous materials such as cellulose char contain large numbers of stable free electrons delocalized in large polycyclic aromatic hydrocarbons. Such electrons can give large polarization enhancements to nearby protons via proton-proton spin-diffusion if they are not so close together that the electron-nuclear dipolar interaction does not broaden the proton resonance beyond detection. For small isolated clusters, the free electrons are fixed and give rise to solid-state enhancements (SS). The maximal proton solid-state enhancement is observed at microwave offsets of ω ≈ ωe ± ωH, where ωe and ωH are the electron and nuclear Larmor frequencies, respectively. For larger and more densely concentrated aromatic clusters, the free electrons can undergo rapid electron exchange interactions.  These electrons give rise to an Overhauser enhancement centered at a microwave offset of  ωe - ωH = 0.  The cellulose char also exhibits electrons undergoing thermal mixing effects (TM). While the enhancement curve reveals the types electron-nuclear spin interactions in a material, it is not quantitative and the relative abundance of the different types of nuclei cannot be determined directly from the curve.

DNP-NMR
DNP can be performed to enhance the NMR signals but also to introduce an inherent spatial dependence: the magnetization enhancement takes place in the vicinity of the irradiated electrons and propagates throughout the sample. Spatial selectivity can finally be obtained using Magnetic Resonance Imaging (MRI) techniques, so that signals from similar parts can be separated based on their location in the sample.
DNP has triggered enthusiasm in the NMR community because it can enhance sensitivity in Solid-state NMR. In DNP, a large electronic spin polarisation is transferred onto the nuclear spins of interest using a microwave source. There are two main DNP approaches for solids. If the material does not contain suitable unpaired electrons, exogenous DNP is applied: the material is impregnated by a solution containing a specific radical. When possible, endogenous DNP is performed using the electrons in transition metal ions (Metal-Ion Dynamic Nuclear Polarization, MIDNP) or conduction electrons. The experiments usually need to be performed at low temperatures with magic angle spinning. It is important to note that DNP was only performed ex situ as it usually requires low temperature to lower electronic relaxation.

References

Further reading

Review articles

Books 
 Carson Jeffries, "Dynamic Nuclear Orientation", New York, Interscience Publishers, 1963
 Anatole Abragam and Maurice Goldman, "Nuclear Magnetism: Order and Disorder", New York : Oxford University Press, 1982
 Tom Wenckebach, "Essentials of Dynamic Nuclear Polarization",  Spindrift Publications, The Netherlands, 2016

Special issues 
 Dynamic Nuclear Polarization: New Experimental and Methodology Approaches and Applications in Physics, Chemistry, Biology and Medicine, Appl. Magn. Reson., 2008. 34(3-4)
 High field dynamic nuclear polarization - the renaissance, Phys. Chem. Chem. Phys., 2010. 12(22)

Blogs 
 The DNP-NMR blog (Link)

Chemical physics
Nuclear magnetic resonance